Jón Ólafur Jónsson (born 5 December 1940) is an Icelandic former footballer who played for the Icelandic men's national football team in 1969. He won the Icelandic championship four times and the Icelandic Cup once as a member of ÍBK.

Honours

Icelandic Championships: 4
1964, 1969, 1971, 1973

Icelandic Cup:
1975

See also
List of Iceland international footballers

References

External links

1940 births
Living people
Jon Olafur Jonsson
Jon Olafur Jonsson
Jon Olafur Jonsson
Association footballers not categorized by position
Jón Ólafur Jónsson